The Tension and the Spark is the second studio album by Darren Hayes, released in 2004. The album was a change for Hayes, who took a more electronic and darker style for this record and also delved deeper into more personal matter. During the recording, the singer has returned his old and traditional black hair which is used for the 1990s and Savage Garden era, before their split in October 2001. This dramatic change alienated some of his fan-base, who were expecting a result similar to his previous effort "Spin". The title of the album is derived from lyrics featured in the second track, "I Like the Way".

Reception
The album was received warmly by critics and fans, praising its personal matter. The Observer said "This album is no folly and succeeds, often to the point of all out triumph, on its own terms." Despite high positive reviews, it was not a large hit, and Hayes split with Columbia Records in 2006.

Singles
 "Pop!ular" was released as the album's first single in July 2004 and becoming a hit, reaching #1 on the US Dance Chart, his first number one. NME praised the song, saying it was "A twistered masterclass in career reintervention...This guy is a genius."
 "Darkness" was released as the album's second single in November 2004, but it did not chart. The physical single has subsequently become a rarity, with copies selling for £100 plus on second-hand websites and collector's auctions.
 "Unlovable" was a promotional single for the album. While it was not released as a single of its own, the music video for the song was made.

Track listing

Charts

Certifications

References

2004 albums
Darren Hayes albums
Columbia Records albums